Hypechiniscus is a genus of tardigrades in the family Echiniscidae. It was named and described by Gustav Thulin in 1928.

Species
The genus includes the following species:
 Hypechiniscus cataractus Gąsiorek, Oczkowski, Bartels, Nelson, Kristensen & Michalczyk, 2021
 Hypechiniscus daedalus Gąsiorek, Oczkowski, Bartels, Nelson, Kristensen & Michalczyk, 2021
 Hypechiniscus exarmatus (Murray, 1907)
 Hypechiniscus fengi Sun & Li, 2013
 Hypechiniscus flavus Gąsiorek, Oczkowski, Bartels, Nelson, Kristensen & Michalczyk, 2021
 Hypechiniscus geminus Gąsiorek, Oczkowski, Bartels, Nelson, Kristensen & Michalczyk, 2021
 Hypechiniscus gladiator (Murray, 1905)
 Hypechiniscus papillifer Robotti, 1972

References

Further reading

 Thulin, 1928 : Über die Phylogenie und das System der Tardigraden. [On the Phylogeny and the System of Tardigrades] Hereditas, vol. 11, no 2/3, p. 207-266.
 Nomenclator Zoologicus info

Echiniscidae
Tardigrade genera